Spirits Colliding is a 1995 album by Irish singer/songwriter Paul Brady, his seventh solo album.

Track listing
"I Want You to Want Me"  (5:59)
"Trust in You"  (5:26)
"World Is What You Make It"  (4:22)
"Marriage Made in Hollywood"  (5:10)
"Help Me to Believe"  (4:57)
"You're the One"  (5:34)
"I Will Be There"  (4:14)
"After the Party's Over"  (6:17)
"Just in Time"  (5:10)
"Love Made a Promise"  (5:04)
"Beautiful World"   (4:55)

Personnel
Paul Brady – vocals, guitar, acoustic guitar, electric guitar, bouzouki, mandolin, tin whistle, piano, keyboards, drums, percussion
Mark E. Nevin – acoustic guitar, electric guitar
Arty McGlynn – guitar
Anthony Drennan – electric guitar
Shay Fitzgerald – harmonica, tom-tom, background vocals
Béla Fleck – 5-string banjo
Victor Wooten – bass
Roy Wooten – drums, percussion
Jimmy Higgins – bodhran
Ger McDonnell – cymbals
Sharon Shannon  – accordion
Bruce Ryder, Adam Orpen-Lynch, Lenny Abrahamson, Andrea Corr, Caroline Corr, Sharon Corr, Sarah Brady – background vocals

External links
 Spirits Colliding on  Amazon

1995 albums
Paul Brady albums